Igor Georgiyevich Luzhkovsky (18 March 1938 – 14 September 2000) was a Russian swimmer who won a gold medal in the 4 × 200 m freestyle relay at the 1958 European Aquatics Championships. He also competed at the 1960 Summer Olympics and finished fifth in the 4 × 100 m medley and eights in the 4 × 200 m freestyle relay. In 1959 he won two gold medals at the Summer Universiade and a national title in the 100 m freestyle, setting a new national record. Between 1958 and 1960 he also set three European records.

He graduated from the Lesgaft University of Physical Education in Saint Petersburg and married Marina Shamal, who also competed in swimming at the 1960 Olympics. He was a lieutenant colonel in the Soviet Army.

References

1938 births
2000 deaths
Russian male freestyle swimmers
Olympic swimmers of the Soviet Union
Swimmers at the 1960 Summer Olympics
European Aquatics Championships medalists in swimming
Medalists at the 1959 Summer Universiade
Universiade medalists in swimming
Universiade gold medalists for the Soviet Union
Soviet male swimmers